Daxing District is a district of Beijing, covering the southern suburbs of the city. It borders the Beijing districts of Tongzhou to the east/northeast, Fangshan to the west, Fengtai to the northwest, Chaoyang to the northeast, and the Hebei province to the south.

History
The Daxing Massacre of August 27-31, 1966 during the Cultural Revolution resulted in the deaths of at least 325 people, ranging in age from 38 days to 80 years.

Daxing District was upgraded from a county to a district with the approval from the State Council on April 30, 2001.

Administrative divisions
In 2021, there are 8 subdistricts, 14 towns with 5 towns of which carry the "area" label in the district, and 4 analogous township-level units:

Culture
Located in the south of Beijing, the area is not as affluent as those that most visitors to Beijing are familiar with, such as Xidan and Guomao.  Much of the industry in Daxing is related to distribution of food and consumer goods to service Beijing.  There are many self-built communities casually created by the residents themselves, mostly of whom have moved in from the countryside.

Government and infrastructure
The Beijing Municipal Administration of Prisons operates the following correctional facilities in the district:
Beijing Municipal Prison
Beijing Women's Prison

Economy
Additionally Okay Airways, and Xiabu Xiabu have their headquarters in Daxing District.

Education

There are two major universities located in Daxing District, the Beijing Institute of Petrochemical Technology and the Beijing Institute of Graphic Communication. Both of them are headquartered in Qingyuan Subdistrict (清源), and have its branch in Kangzhuang (康庄). Qingyuan and Kangzhuang are planned as a university town in Daxing District. The Yang Guang Qing School of Beijing is also located in the district.

National Seminary of Catholic Church in China is in Daxing District.

Transportation

It was decided in 2009 that Daxing would be the location of the Beijing Daxing International Airport. It was constructed in the southern part of Daxing District of Beijing and along the border of Beijing and Hebei Province. The airport was opened in September 2019.

Metro
Daxing is currently served by four metro lines of the Beijing Subway:

  - , 
  - Xihongmen, Gaomidian North, Gaomidian South, Zaoyuan, Qingyuanlu, Huangcun Xidajie, Huangcun Railway Station, Yihezhuang, Biomedical Base, Tiangongyuan
  - Jiugong, Yizhuangqiao, Yizhuang Culture Park, Wanyuanjie, Rongjingdongjie, Rongchangdongjie
  -

Climate 

Daxing has a humid continental climate (Köppen climate classification Dwa).

References

 
Districts of Beijing